Yoán Manuel Moncada Olivera (born May 27, 1995) is a Cuban professional baseball third baseman for the Chicago White Sox of Major League Baseball (MLB). He made his MLB debut for the Boston Red Sox in 2016, and was traded to the White Sox during the 2016–2017 offseason.

Baseball career

Elefantes de Cienfuegos
Moncada made his debut for Cienfuegos of the Cuban National Series in 2012. In his two years with Cienfuegos he hit .277/.388/.380 with four home runs and 21 stolen bases. Moncada left Cuba in June 2014 with permission of the Cuban government to pursue a career in Major League Baseball (MLB). Before signing with the Red Sox, Moncada was a highly sought after Cuban free agent. He was seen as a generational, five-tool talent, being compared to the likes of Robinson Cano.

Minor leagues

On February 23, 2015, the Boston Red Sox reportedly agreed to terms with Moncada, for a signing bonus of $31.5 million. The contract was finalized on March 12. He made his professional debut with the Greenville Drive of the Class A South Atlantic League on May 18. In the winter of 2015, he was consistently cited as one of the top prospects in the Red Sox system.

Entering the 2016 season, MLB.com ranked Moncada as the 7th best prospect in Major League Baseball.

Boston Red Sox
Moncada was called up and made his major league debut on September 2, 2016, against the Oakland Athletics. In his first plate appearance, he walked and subsequently scored a run. He recorded his first major league hit the following day. Moncada finished the 2016 MLB season with a .211 batting average (4-for-19) with one RBI.

Chicago White Sox

On December 6, 2016, the Red Sox traded Moncada, Michael Kopech, Luis Alexander Basabe, and Victor Diaz to the Chicago White Sox for Chris Sale.

Moncada began the 2017 season with the Charlotte Knights of the Class AAA International League. On July 19, 2017, he was called up after the trade of Todd Frazier to the New York Yankees. Later that day, he made his Chicago White Sox debut against the Los Angeles Dodgers. He worked a walk in his first at bat, against Kenta Maeda.

On July 26, 2017, Moncada hit his first career major league home run off of Jake Arrieta of the Chicago Cubs. On August 25, he was placed on the 10-day disabled list due to shin issues. He played 54 games in 2017, finishing year with a .231 batting average, 8 home runs, and 22 RBIs.

In 2018, Moncada played 149 games, finishing with a .235 batting average, 32 doubles, 17 home runs, 61 RBIs, and struck out an MLB-leading 217 times. He had the lowest fielding percentage among major league second basemen, at .963.

In the 2019 campaign, Moncada set career highs in numerous batting areas, such as hits (161), doubles (34), home runs (25), RBIs (79), and batting average (.315), among others, with his batting average ranking third in the American League. 

Overall, in 2020, Moncada batted .225 with six home runs and 24 RBIs in 52 games. 

In 2021, Moncada batted .263 in 144 games hitting 14 home runs and 61 RBIs.

For 2022, Moncada began the season on the injured list with an oblique strain. On May 9, Moncada was activated off the IL and made his season debut that day against the Cleveland Guardians going 1-for-4.

Musical career
In 2021, Moncada recorded "Desastre Personal" with artists El Chacal and Lenier.

World Baseball Classic
In 2024, Moncada was one of four current or former MLB players who defected from Cuba, yet chose to represent Communist Cuba's National Team.  When asked if he supported "Patria y Vida", the mantra of the oppressed in Cuba and abroad which translates to Country and liberty, Moncada stated he had no comment.

References

External links

Joan Manuel Moncada, a prospect of Cienfuegos Baseball

1995 births
Living people
2023 World Baseball Classic players
Boston Red Sox players
Chicago White Sox players
Elefantes de Cienfuegos players
Greenville Drive players
Major League Baseball infielders
Major League Baseball players from Cuba
Cuban expatriate baseball players in the United States
People from Abreus, Cuba
Portland Sea Dogs players
Salem Red Sox players
Surprise Saguaros players
Charlotte Knights players